The 2003 Prince Edward Island Scott Tournament of Hearts, a women's curling event, was held January 17–20, at the Montague Curling Club in Montague, Prince Edward Island. The winning team was Team Suzanne Gaudet who represented Prince Edward Island, finished with a 10-1 round-robin record and finished 3rd overall in the page playoff at the 2003 Scott Tournament of Hearts in Kitchener, Ontario.

Teams

A Event

B event

C event

Playoffs

Semi-final
January 22, 2:00 PM AT

Final
January 22, 7:00 PM AT

References

Prince Edward Island Scott Tournament Of Hearts, 2003
2003 in Prince Edward Island
Curling competitions in Prince Edward Island
Montague, Prince Edward Island